is an orbital motorway around the German capital city of Berlin. It should not be confused with the Berliner Stadtring (Bundesautobahn 100) around Berlin's inner city.

Course 

The highway route markers run clockwise from the interchange at Schwanebeck (the former Prenzlau branch-off), where the Bundesautobahn 11 runs to Szczecin, Poland via the Pomellen/Kołbaskowo border crossing and the Polish A6 autostrada. From here the beltway leads southwards to the Spreeau interchange with the Bundesautobahn 12 to Frankfurt (Oder) and the Polish A2 autostrada. At the Schönefeld four-way interchange, the Bundesautobahn 13 leads to Dresden and the Bundesautobahn 113 to the Berliner Stadtring and the Berlin city centre via Berlin Brandenburg Airport.

The Berliner Ring then runs westwards to Nuthetal, where the Bundesautobahn 115 (including the former AVUS race track) also links to the Stadtring at the Funkturm Berlin. Next the Bundesautobahn 9 leads to Munich (at the Potsdam interchange) and the Bundesautobahn 2 to the Ruhr area (at Werder). From here the beltway runs northwards to the Dreieck Havelland interchange with the Bundesautobahn 24 to Hamburg, and finally turns eastwards to the Oranienburg and Pankow interchanges with the Bundesautobahn 111 and Bundesautobahn 114 motorways both leading to the Berliner Stadtring. It again reaches Schwanebeck at km 196.

The beginning and end of the kilometer is the cross Barnim, which until 2013 Dreieck Schwanebeck was called. From there, the A11 from Stettin / Prenzlau joins the A10. In the direction of the kilometering (clockwise), the A12 leads from the outside at the triangle Spreeau, at the junction Schoenefeld the A13, at the triangle Potsdam the A9, at the triangle Werder the A 2 and at the triangle Havelland the A 24 in the Berliner Ring. The highway is connected to the Berliner Stadtring (A 100) and other parts of Berlin via the A 111 (Oranienburg), A 114 (Pankow), A 113 (Kreuz Schönefeld) and A 115 (Nuthetal), the northern part is called AVUS known), which open from the inside into the ring. The junctions Ludwigsfelde-Ost and Berlin-Spandau as well as the Oranienburg cross lead to motorway-like developed federal highways.

History
The first sections near Werder, Schwanebeck and Spreeau were opened between 1936 and the outbreak of World War II in 1939 as part of the Reichsautobahn program. Construction works were not resumed until 1972, when the East German authorities began to complete the orbital, in order to bypass West Berlin on the way from the capital East Berlin to Potsdam and the motorways leading to Magdeburg and Leipzig.  The final stretch opened in 1979.

Those that are built from 1972 to 1979:

In the section between the former Berlin-Weißensee junction and the Berlin-Spandau interchange, the freeway completed today does not follow the original route.

East of today's triangle Pankow (A 114) on the B 109 the junction Pankow-Wandlitz should be created. From there, the projected route between the villages of Mühlenbeck and Schildow ran through to the planned Nordkreuz, which was to be built around one kilometer south of Schönfließ. It was planned to create a motorway interchange from the current A 11 south of Lanke to the designated feeder road in Wittenau. In the further course, the connection points Reinickendorf-Oranienburg were planned on the B 96 south of the Invalidensiedlung in Reinickendorf and Tegel-Hennigsdorf south of Velten. From there, the proposed route followed essentially the present day Berlin railroad outer ring to the junction Spandau-Pausin on the L 16. Immediately south of today's Havel Canal was the Hamburg Cross projected. From the planned junction Heerstraße-Nauen on the B 5 (today's name: Berlin-Spandau), the Berliner Ring has been built up to the junction Potsdam-Nord on the original route.

During the construction of the motorway Berlin-Szczecin-South (today: Kołbaskowo) in 1936 was built in the northern branch of the intersection Weißensee a gas station, which was however demolished without replacement in the course of the further construction of the ring and the redesign of the junction. During the reconstruction of the AD Schwanebeck (today: motorway junction Barnim) in 2012, part of the area was uncovered. The two fuel tanks still in the ground were full of water, but could be easily removed.

Planning
According to a press release by Brandenburg Transport Minister Jörg Vogelsänger on 1 February 2011, the motorway from the Junction Kremmen-South on the A 24 via the Havelland triangle to the Barnim cross in 2022 will be passable in six lanes. This relieves the busy northern Berliner Ring. At Oranienburg alone, 51,000 vehicles a day are on the road, just under a fifth of which are trucks. The total cost of the project is expected to total around 300 million euros.

In the course of expansion, the triangle Schwanebeck was redesigned into a motorway junction and renamed "Cross Barnim". The main roadway is now the Berliner Ring and not the direction of the northern Berliner Ring - A 11. The Berlin-Weißensee junction is omitted because of the immediate proximity to the motorway junction. Instead, the B 2 was transferred directly to the A 11 and at the same time the A 11 to 2.0 km fundamentally removed and rebuilt. The construction work began in the spring of 2010 with extensive clearing measures in the area of the motorway triangle Schwanebeck (construction plan) and the bridge construction between Weissensee and the triangle Pankow on the A 10. The groundbreaking ceremony for the conversion took place on 5 May 2011. After a construction period of 29 months, the motorway junction was officially handed over to traffic on November 11, 2013.

In July 2011, the planning approval decision for the six-lane expansion from the Neuruppin junction (A 24) to the junction Oberkrämer (A 10) including the reconstruction of the Havelland triangle was published. On 17 September 2012, the symbolic groundbreaking ceremony for the expansion of the section triangle Havelland Kremmen. Overall, it was expected to cost 52 million euros. The European Union contributed €18 million to the financing from the European Regional Development Fund. The developed section was put into operation on September 27, 2014. In addition, on 7 October 2015, the developed section of Berlin was opened to traffic.

The route between the triangle Nuthetal and the triangle Potsdam should be expanded eight-lane. The construction costs are estimated at around 123 million euros, the plan approval decision is available since January 2013. 61 additional truck parking spaces are planned for the Michendorf service area. The afforestation as a compensatory measure for the environment are now carried out close to local complaints, instead of as originally planned by Ribbeck or Thyrow, also the use of open-pored asphalt (whispering asphalt) at Michendorf has now been included in the planning. On the noise barriers to be built originally photovoltaic systems were planned with a capacity of about 7.5 MWp. The tendering procedure for the construction of these "solar noise barriers" started in September 2013 and a private investor was to be found for this purpose. This was to bear the costs of increasing the originally planned six to eight-meter-high noise barriers to about ten meters and recover the associated additional costs of marketing the solar power. After no investor found this, the project for the construction of the photovoltaic systems and the increase of the noise protection walls is considered as failed. The start of construction of the section took place with the official ground-breaking ceremony on March 31, 2016, the costs are now reported at 150 million euros.

The section between the triangle Werder and Groß Kreutz is to be expanded to six lanes. These measures are in the urgent need of the Federal Transport Infrastructure Plan. The replacement of the bridge over the Zernsee between the junctions Phöben and Leest has already been built six lanes, with currently only two lanes are released in each direction. Furthermore, the six-lane extension between Groß Kreutz and Havelland is planned (further demand with planning rights). In the area of the Berlin-Spandau interchange, the overpass of the newly built Federal Highway 5 has already been prepared for the upcoming expansion, as well as the double bridge over the Havel Canal in the further course.

Exit list

See also 
 List of motorways in Germany
 Périphérique (Paris)
 M25 motorway (London)
 Capital Beltway (Washington, DC)
 MKAD (Moscow)
 A10 motorway (Netherlands) (Amsterdam)

References

External links 

10
A010
A010
Ring roads in Germany
Constituent roads of European route E30
Buildings and structures in Oberhavel